Fair Enough is a 1918 American silent comedy film directed by Edward Sloman and starring Margarita Fischer, Eugenie Forde, and Alfred Hollingsworth.

Cast
 Margarita Fischer as Ann Dickson 
 Eugenie Forde as Mrs. Ellen Dickson 
 Alfred Hollingsworth as James Dickson Esq. 
 Alice Knowland as Madame Ohnet 
 Harry McCoy as Frederick Pierson 
 Jack Mower as Carey Phelan 
 Bull Montana as 'Happy' Flanigan 
 J. Farrell MacDonald as Chief of Police Morgan

References

Bibliography
 George A. Katchmer. Eighty Silent Film Stars: Biographies and Filmographies of the Obscure to the Well Known. McFarland, 1991.

External links

1918 films
1918 comedy films
Silent American comedy films
Films directed by Edward Sloman
American silent feature films
1910s English-language films
American black-and-white films
Pathé Exchange films
1910s American films